Alngey is a stratovolcano in central Kamchatka. The volcano is located to the east of the shield volcano Tekletunup and to the west of the crest of the northern Sredinny Range.

See also
List of volcanoes in Russia

References

Volcanoes of the Kamchatka Peninsula
Mountains of the Kamchatka Peninsula
Stratovolcanoes of Russia
Holocene stratovolcanoes
Holocene Asia